The Hero of the Red-Light District, (also titled Yoshiwara: The Pleasure Quarter (Yoto Monogatari: Hana No Yoshiwara Hyakunin Giri) or Killing in Yoshiwara) is a 1960 film by Tomu Uchida.

Plot
A successful provincial merchant cannot find a wife because of a disfiguring birthmark. Even the courtesans in Yoshiwara refuse to entertain him, until an indentured peasant prostitute, Tamarazu, treats him with tenderness. The disfigured businessman finds love with Tamarazu.

Review
"The film that led David Shipman to declare Uchida “the equal of Mizoguchi and Kinugasa,” Killing in Yoshiwara ranks with Uchida’s finest postwar work. This dark melodrama’s sudden and violent end in a shower of cherry blossoms is one of the most impressive scenes in Uchida’s canon."

References

1960 drama films